The E.torQ is a family of inline-4 gasoline automobile engines produced since 2011 by Fiat Chrysler Automobiles in Campo Largo, Brazil in the former Tritec factory. In November of 2022 Stellantis announced they were closing the Campo Largo factory ending production of the E.torQ 1.8 to focus on production of the newer FCA Global Small Engine. 

The E.torQ series is an update on the Tritec engine, albeit re-engineered by Fiat Powertrain Technologies with an investment of €83 million. Updates include a high pressure injected aluminum block from the previous iron, and upgraded motors and controllers for the CNC machines used in the manufacturing process to increase productivity and ease diagnosis. The engine block has cylinder head fittings separate from the cylinder jackets, the threads are positioned in the upper part of the water jackets, and the connections between the jackets and the outside are kept apart from the cylinder head fittings. 80% of torque becomes available at 1,500 rpm and 93% at 2,500.

The new family of E.torQ engines is composed of two variants: the 1.6 16v and the 1.8 16v; both engines are available in flexifuel (petrol or ethanol) version for the Brazilian and Paraguayan markets.

The series was introduced to replace General Motors' 1.8 Ecotec X18XE engine used in Brazilian Fiat models, as well as the old Torque engine used in various Fiat models.

In March 2018, the series reached a milestone of 1.2 million units produced; 35% of total production was exported to FCA plants in Argentina, Turkey, and Fiat's native Italy.

1.6
The  variant uses  bore and stroke.

Output:

Application:
 2011 – 2016 Fiat Palio Weekend/Adventure (176)
 2011 – 2012 Fiat Palio (176)
 2011 – 2017 Fiat Palio (326)
 2011 – 2017 Fiat Punto (310)
 2011 – 2012 Fiat Siena (176)
 2012 – 2018 Fiat Grand Siena (326)/Dodge Vision
 2012 – 2016 Fiat Strada (176)/RAM 700
 2011 – 2016 Fiat Idea (Brazilian version)
 2014 – present Jeep Renegade
 2015 – present Fiat 500X
 2015 – present Fiat Tipo (and rebadged Fiat Egea and Dodge Neon)

1.8 NPM
The 1.8L NPM (1,747cc) variant uses a  bore and stroke and a 11.2:1 compression ratio. The 1.8L block can be externally differentiated from the 1.6L version by a large "1.8" cast into the front of the block. It carries the 1.8 nomenclature despite being closer to 1.7L in displacement.  

Output:

Application:
 2011 – 2016 Fiat Linea
 2011 – 2014 Fiat Bravo (198)
 2011 – 2017 Fiat Punto (310)
 2011 – 2021 Fiat Doblò
 2011 – 2020 Fiat Palio Weekend/Adventure (176)
 2012 – 2020 Fiat Strada (176)
 2011 – 2016 Fiat Idea (Brazilian version)
 2015 – 2021 Jeep Renegade
 2016 – 2021 Fiat Toro
 2017 – 2021 Fiat Argo
 2018 - 2021 Fiat Cronos

1.8 EVO
Starting with the 2015 model year Jeep Renegade the E.torQ engine received a variable cam phasing system that operated over a wide range, allowing for 60° of variation. The compression ratio was raised to 12.5:1. The high compression ratio was utilised in conjunction with the variable cam timing to allow the engine to operate in Atkinson cycle mode. This change in cam phasing also allows for a lower RPM onset of peak torque. Other revisions include updated pistons, a variable rate oil pump, higher energy ignition system, iridium spark plugs, and a cold start system utilizing a single fuel injector that pulls fuel from an auxiliary fuel tank filled with gasoline to assist with starting the engine when fueled with ethanol.

Output:

1.8 EVO VIS

For the 2016 model year Jeep Renegade the EVO engine was updated again with VIS (Variable Induction System) that uses a set of electronically actuated valves to alternate between two separate intake tracks of different lengths, with the crossover occurring at 4250 RPM. This allows the engine to make more power at higher RPM. This update also adds a Marelli HCSS cold start system that heats the ethanol in the fuel rail.

Output:

References

External links
 E.TorQ.com official site

Fiat engines
Straight-four engines
Gasoline engines by model